3 Deep is the third studio album by Surface, released in 1990 on Columbia Records. The first single from the album, "The First Time" claimed the top spot on the U.S. pop charts for two straight weeks. The second single, "All I Want Is You", teams Bernard Jackson with songstress Regina Belle on vocals and peaked at number eight on the Hot R&B Singles chart. Third single "Never Gonna Let You Down" peaked at number 17 on both the Billboard Hot 100 and Adult Contemporary charts.

Track listing

Personnel 
Adapted from Discogs.

Surface
 Bernard Jackson – lead and backing vocals, raps, synthesizers, fretless bass, drum programming
 David Townsend – keyboards, synthesizers, guitars, synth bass, drum programming, backing vocals 
 David "Pic" Conley – synthesizers, synth bass, flute, shakuhachi, drum programming, backing vocals 

Additional musicians
 Brian Simpson – keyboards (1, 6), synth bass (1, 6), drum programming (1, 6)
 Bobby Wooten – acoustic piano (1, 9), synth strings (1, 9)
 Vassal Benford – keyboards (2, 5, 7, 8, 10), acoustic piano (2, 5, 7, 8, 10), synth strings (2, 5, 7, 8, 10)
 Joshua Thompson – keyboards (8), strings (8), synth bass (8)
 Gene Lennon – programming (8)
 "Bassy" Bob Brockmann – drum programming (1, 4), drum overdubs (4)
 Gene Lake – drums (4), keyboards (11), synth bass (11), drum programming (11)
 Guy Vaughn – drum programming (7), percussion (7)
 Regina Belle – backing vocals (2, 3), special love voice (2), lead vocals (3)
 Everett Collins – backing vocals (2, 10)
 Derrick Culler – backing vocals (2)
 Monet Jackson – lead vocals (8)
 Bianca Conley – vocals (9)

Strings (Tracks 4, 6 & 9)
 Bobby Wooten – arrangements and conductor 
 Eileen Folson – contractor 
 Belinda Whitney-Barratt – concertmaster
 Melanie Baker, Carlos Baptiste, Sandra Billingslea, Alfred Brown, Felix Farrar, Crystal Garner, Juliet Haffner, Marianne Henry, Cecelia Hobbs, Clarissa Howell, Jon Kass, Patmore Lewis, Alfred McCall, Diane Monroe, Garfield Moore, Maxine Roach, Richard E. Spencer, Lesa Terry, Brenda Vincent and Bruce Wang – string performers

Production 
 Surface – producers, mixing (3, 5, 7, 8, 12), mix assistance (9)
 John Falzarano – recording (1, 6)
 David Conley – recording (2-5, 7-12)
 Bobby Wooten – additional engineer (1)
 David Leibowitz – additional engineer (4)
 Bob Giammarco – digital editing
 Scott Canto – assistant engineer, digital editing assistant 
 Paul Higgins – assistant engineer, mixing (3, 12)
 Kendal Stubbs – assistant engineer 
 Bob Brockmann – mixing (1, 2, 4, 6, 10, 11)
 Carl Beatty – mixing (5, 7, 8, 9)
 Jose Fernandez – mix assistant (1, 2, 4, 6, 10, 11)
 Chris Savino – mix assistant (1, 2, 4, 6, 10, 11)
 Judy Kirschner – mix assistant (3, 5, 7, 8, 12), mixing (9)
 Jeff Toone – mix assistant (3, 12)
 Jose Rodriguez – mastering
 Stephanie McCravey – production assistant 
 Carol Chen – art direction, design
 Todd Gray – cover photography 
 Cesar Vera – inner photography 
 Earl Cole – management

Studios
 Mixed at Marathon Studios, SoundTracks and Sorceror Sound (New York City, New York); House of Music (West Orange, New Jersey).
 Mastered at Sterling Sound (New York City, New York).

Charts

Weekly charts

Year-end charts

Certifications

References

External links
 
 Facebook Page
 Soulwalking page
 Bio at R&B Haven
 Bio at AllThingsDeep

Columbia Records albums
1990 albums
Surface (band) albums